|}

The Duke of Cambridge Stakes is a Group 2 flat horse race in Great Britain open to fillies and mares aged four years or older. It is run at Ascot over a distance of 1 mile (1,609 metres), and it is scheduled to take place each year in June.

The race is one of several for older fillies which were introduced across Europe in 2004. These were designed as an incentive to keep more of their gender from being exported or prematurely retired to stud. It was originally titled the Windsor Forest Stakes, and was renamed the Duke of Cambridge Stakes in 2013 in honour of Prince William, Duke of Cambridge.

The Duke of Cambridge Stakes is now contested on the second day of the five-day Royal Ascot meeting.

Records
Most successful horse:
 no horse has won this race more than once

Leading jockey (3 wins):

 William Buick - Joviality (2012), Aljazzi (2018), Saffron Beach (2022)

Leading trainer (4 wins): (includes jointly-trained winners)
 Sir Michael Stoute – Favourable Terms (2004), Peeress (2005), Strawberrydaiquiri (2010), Integral (2014)
 John Gosden - Nannina (2007), Joviality (2012), Nazeef (2020), Indie Angel (2021)

Winners

See also
 Horse racing in Great Britain
 List of British flat horse races

References
 Racing Post:

 galopp-sieger.de – Windsor Forest Stakes.
 ifhaonline.org – International Federation of Horseracing Authorities – Duke of Cambridge Stakes (2019).
 pedigreequery.com – Windsor Forest Stakes – Ascot.

Flat races in Great Britain
Ascot Racecourse
Mile category horse races for fillies and mares
Recurring sporting events established in 2004
2004 establishments in England